Scant City, also known as Marghton, is an unincorporated community in Marshall County, Alabama, United States. It is between Arab and Guntersville.

Local legend is that the origin of the name is from bootlegging days, when a local man was infamous for selling “scant pints” of slightly less moonshine to unsuspecting customers.

References

Unincorporated communities in Marshall County, Alabama
Unincorporated communities in Alabama